The 1992 European Cup Winners' Cup Final was a football match contested between Werder Bremen of Germany (who qualified for the tournament through the West German berth) and Monaco of France. It was the final match of the 1991–92 European Cup Winners' Cup and the 32nd European Cup Winners' Cup final. The final was held at Estádio da Luz in Lisbon. The attendance of 16,000 in a stadium which, at the time, had a capacity of around 130,000 meant that this was one of the most sparsely-attended UEFA finals of all time, both in actual and relative terms. Bremen won the match 2–0 thanks to goals of Klaus Allofs and Wynton Rufer.

Route to the final

Match

Details

See also
1992 European Cup Final
1992 UEFA Cup Final
AS Monaco FC in European football
SV Werder Bremen in European football

External links
UEFA Cup Winners' Cup results at Rec.Sport.Soccer Statistics Foundation

3
SV Werder Bremen matches
AS Monaco FC matches
1992
1992
1991–92 in German football
May 1992 sports events in Europe
Sports competitions in Lisbon
1990s in Lisbon